Izvornik is a village in Valchi Dol Municipality, Varna Province, Bulgaria.

Villages in Varna Province